Requiem is a novel by the American writer A. E. Fisher set during the Great Depression in Pittsburgh, Pennsylvania. It tells the story of a week in the life of a family of six struggling to survive.

References

1933 American novels
Novels set in Pittsburgh
Great Depression novels
John Day Company books